Plateosauria is a clade of sauropodomorph dinosaurs which lived during the Late Triassic to the Late Cretaceous. The name Plateosauria was first coined by Gustav Tornier in 1913. The name afterwards fell out of use until the 1980s.

Classification
Plateosauria is a node-based taxon. In 1998, Paul Sereno defined Plateosauria as the last common ancestor of Plateosaurus engelhardti and Massospondylus carinatus, and its descendants. Peter Galton and Paul Upchurch in 2004 used a different definition: the last common ancestor of Plateosaurus  engelhardti and Jingshanosaurus xinwaensis, and its descendants. In their cladistic analysis the Plateosauria belonged to the Prosauropoda, and included the Plateosauridae subgroup. In Galton's and Upchurch's study also Coloradisaurus, Euskelosaurus, Jingshanosaurus, Massospondylus, Mussaurus, Sellosaurus, and Yunnanosaurus proved to be plateosaurians.

However, recent cladistic analyses suggest that the Prosauropoda as traditionally defined is paraphyletic to sauropods. Prosauropoda, as currently defined, is a synonym of Plateosauridae as both contain the same taxa by definition. The most recent phylogenetic analysis recovered Issi and Plateosaurus as the basal-most plateosaurs.

The following cladogram simplified after an analysis presented by Apaldetti and colleagues in 2011.

The following cladogram simplified after an analysis presented by Blair McPhee and colleagues in 2014.

References

 
Sauropodomorphs